Sankt Bernhard is a municipality in the district of Hildburghausen, in Thuringia, Germany. It has a population of 251 (Dec. 2020).

References

Hildburghausen (district)
Duchy of Saxe-Meiningen